Two ships of the Royal Navy have borne the name HMS Afridi, after the Afridi ethnic group in present-day Pakistan:

  was a  destroyer launched in 1907 and sold in 1919. She was wrecked in 1920.
  was a  destroyer launched in 1937. She was sunk by German air attack in 1940.

Royal Navy ship names